Megalocercus is a genus of tunicates belonging to the family Oikopleuridae.

The species of this genus are found in Pacific Ocean.

Species:

Megalocercus abyssorum 
Megalocercus huxleyi

References

Tunicates